Z.E. or Ze can refer to:

Arts and mythology
 Ze (manga)
 Bai Ze, a beast in Chinese legend
 Zé Povinho, a Portuguese everyman character
 Zé Pilintra, a folkloric and spiritual character from the Afro-Brazilian and regional religions

Businesses and brands
 ZE Records, a record label
 Renault Z.E., an electric car
 Renault Fluence Z.E.
 Eastar Jet (IATA airline code ZE)

Language
 Ze (Cyrillic), a letter of the Cyrillic alphabet
Reversed Ze, a Cyrillic letter used in the Enets and the Khanty languages
 Ze (cuneiform), a sign in cuneiform writing
 Ze (pronoun), a gender-neutral pronoun in English
 Źe, a letter in the Pashto alphabet
 Že, a letter in the Perso-Arabic alphabet

People

With the stage name
 Z.E (born 1994), a Swedish rapper

With the given name
 Zhang Ze, a Chinese male tennis player
 Ze Frank (born 1972), a performance artist
 Zé (given name), a Portuguese form of the name José, shared by several notable people

With the surname
 Tom Zé (born 1936), a Brazilian musician
 Ze Rong (died 195 C.E.), a general and active occultist serving under the warlord Tao Qian

Places
 Zè, Benin
 ZE postcode area, a group of postcode districts covering the Shetland Islands in Scotland

Other uses
 Indian locomotive class ZE, a narrow gauge 2-8-2 steam locomotive class
 Zero emission, qualification of an engine, motor or process
 The charge of an electron as described in Charge number